Beate Schrott (born 15 April 1988, in St. Pölten) is an Austrian athlete who specialises in the 100 metres hurdles. She finished eighth in the 100 m hurdles at the 2012 Summer Olympics. In April 2019, Schrott became engaged to American triple jumper Christian Taylor. In November 2019 she completed a doctoral degree at the Medical University of Vienna, in autumn 2021 she married Taylor.

Achievements 

1Did not finish in the semifinals

References

External links 

 Official website 
 

1988 births
Living people
People from Sankt Pölten
Austrian female hurdlers
Olympic athletes of Austria
Athletes (track and field) at the 2012 Summer Olympics
Athletes (track and field) at the 2016 Summer Olympics
World Athletics Championships athletes for Austria
European Games gold medalists for Austria
Athletes (track and field) at the 2015 European Games
European Games medalists in athletics
Sportspeople from Lower Austria